The Chiquitano are an indigenous people of Bolivia and Brazil.

Chiquitano may also refer to:

Chiquitano language, the language of the Chiquitano people
Chiquitano dry forests, a dry forest region of Bolivia and Brazil
Chiquitano (beetle) , a genus of beetles in the tribe Ibidionini.

See also
Chiquitania, a tropical savanna region in Bolivia